The following lists events that happened in 1928 in the Imperial State of Persia.

Incumbents
 Shah: Reza Shah
 Prime Minister: Mehdi Qoli Hedayat

Events

Births
 January 14 – Ali Akbar Moinfar, politician (d. 2018) (died 2018)
 August 20 – Amou Haji, he did not wash for over 60 years (d. 2022) (died 2022)

Deaths

References

 
1920s in Iran
Years of the 20th century in Iran
Persia
Persia